The 7th Goya Awards were presented in Madrid, Spain on 13 March 1993. The gala was hosted by Imanol Arias.

Belle Époque won the award for Best Film.

Winners and nominees

Major award nominees

Other award nominees

Honorary Goya
 Imanol Arias

References

07
1992 film awards
1992 in Spanish cinema